Joy House (French title: Les Félins / UK title: The Love Cage) is a 1964 French mystery–thriller film starring Jane Fonda, Alain Delon and Lola Albright. It is based on the 1954 novel of the same name by Day Keene.

The film was directed by René Clément, his second for MGM.

Plot
In Monte Carlo, Marc, a handsome card sharp, escapes American gangsters who have been ordered to kill him by the boss of a New York gang because he had an affair with the boss's wife. Marc hides in a mission for the poor where Barbara, a wealthy widow, finds him and hires him as her chauffeur.

At Barbara's chateau, Melinda, Barbara's niece, becomes attracted to him. Marc discovers that Barbara is hiding her lover, Vincent, in the secret rooms and passageways of the chateau. She and Vincent (a bank robber sought by the police for murdering Barbara's husband) plan to murder Marc so that Vincent may use his passport in escaping to South America. Marc and Barbara begin an affair but are discovered by Vincent, who then kills Barbara but is also killed by the American gangsters who mistake him for Marc.

Marc and Melinda plan to dispose of the two bodies, but when Melinda learns that Marc is planning to leave without her, she tricks the police into believing that Marc is guilty and forces him to hide in the chateau's secret rooms. He is her prisoner, just as Vincent had been her aunt's.

Cast
 Jane Fonda as Melinda
 Alain Delon as Marc
 Lola Albright as Barbara
 Sorrell Booke as Harry
 Carl Studer as Loftus
 André Oumansky as Vincent
 Arthur Howard as Father Nielson
 Del Negro as Mick

Production
The film was based on a Day Keene novel published in 1954. The New York Times called the book "more conventional than usual" but said the story was "... well constructed and sharply twisted in the James M. Cain manner."

Film rights were bought by MGM, who signed René Clément to direct; he had previously made The Day and the Hour for MGM, which, as with Joy House, featured both American and French actors.

MGM signed Alain Delon to a five-picture deal following the studio's successful collaboration with him on 1963's Any Number Can Win.

In March 1963, it was that announced Natalie Wood would appear opposite Delon. However, Wood soon dropped out and was replaced by Jane Fonda.

Filming started in August 1963. The film was partly shot in the historic Villa Torre Clementina.

It was Jane Fonda's first movie in France. Of the shoot, she said, "there was chaos, rain and script changes, I fought sixty battles and won them all." She shot her part speaking English and was dubbed into French. She later recalled that Clément made the film without a script:
I didn't speak very good French then, and I never understood much of what was going on. The only people who really dug that movie, for some reason, were junkies. They used to come up to me and give me a big wink. But I'm awfully glad I did it because it got me into France and I met [later husband Roger] Vadim.
Fonda would marry Vadim in 1965 and live in France for several years.

Reception
The Los Angeles Times called the film "an oddball thriller."

References

External links

1964 films
American black-and-white films
Films directed by René Clément
French black-and-white films
English-language French films
1960s French-language films
Metro-Goldwyn-Mayer films
Films based on American novels
Films scored by Lalo Schifrin
Films set on the French Riviera
1960s English-language films
1960s multilingual films
French multilingual films